The following is a list of IBO female world champions certificated by the International Boxing Organization (IBO).

Stand: June 25, 2022.

r – Champion relinquished title.
s – Champion stripped of title.

Minimumweight

Light flyweight

Flyweight

Super flyweight

Bantamweight

Super bantamweight

Featherweight

Super featherweight

Lightweight

Super lightweight

Welterweight

Super welterweight

Middleweight

Super middleweight

Light heavyweight

Heavyweight

See also

International Boxing Organization
List of IBO world champions

References

External links

Women
Women's boxing
IBO
IBO
Incomplete sports lists
Incomplete sports result lists